Quiz Show Q, also known under the direct translation, Strongest Victor Quiz Show Q, is a South Korean television quiz show broadcast by the Munhwa Broadcasting Corporation. It is hosted by comedian Park Myeong-su, singer IU, and host Sun Bom Soo.

History
The show began its debut on August 19, 2012.

In December 2012, Quiz Show Q was announced to be cancelled alongside several other MBC shows due to changes in time slot availability. It was also noted in the announcement that the show had received low ratings. The show was broadcast until February 2013. It was later reported that neither Park Myeong-su nor IU's agency's were aware of the cancellation.

Format
The show features ten teams of ten members who compete amongst one another. Once a team is victorious, the members of this winning team will compete amongst each other until there is a single winner within the team. This single winner will then compete against the winner of the previous show to determine who will be the final winner for a given show. If one contestant can win seven shows in a row, they will earn 300 million South Korean won, which is the largest amount to be given out for a South Korean Quiz show at the time of the show's debut.

References

External links
Quiz Show Q MBC official homepage 

2012 South Korean television series debuts
2013 South Korean television series endings
MBC TV original programming